Operation Deckhouse Five was a United States Marine Corps (USMC) and Republic of Vietnam Marine Corps operation that took place from 6–15 January 1967 in the Mekong Delta, during the Vietnam War. "The ten-day sweep," reported the AP from its daily military roundup from Saigon, "proved unproductive."

Background
For the USMC, the operation was notable for the following reasons: it was a sizable, combined USMC and Vietnamese Marine amphibious operation and it was the last Special Landing Force (SLF) amphibious landing to take place beyond the boundaries of I Corps. An SLF was the designation of the Marine battalion (1st Battalion, 9th Marine Regiment reinforced) and the medium helicopter squadron (HMM) assigned to the Seventh Fleet Amphibious Ready Group. The SLF regularly conducted amphibious operations across Vietnamese beaches into areas of suspected Viet Cong and People's Army of Vietnam (PAVN) activity. The intent of the operation was to secure ammunition dumps, ordnance and engineering workshops, hospitals, and indoctrination centers.

Operation
After 2 days of postponement due to bad weather, the operation began on 6 January with a sea and heliborne assault onto the beaches between the Co Chien and Ham Luong branches of the Mekong Delta which was suspected of being a Viet Cong stronghold.

Supporting units
 HMM-362
 VMO-3
 USS Iwo Jima (LPH-2)
 USS Canberra (CA-70)

Aftermath
The operation was a ‘disappointment’ resulting in ‘only’ 21 Vietcong killed, 2 small arms workshops destroyed and 44 weapons captured for the loss of 7 US and 1 Vietnamese Marines. It was believed that the Vietcong had been forewarned of the attack because intelligence learned that larger Vietcong units had recently left the area.

References

External links

 Information from www.vietnam-war.info
 E/2/3 memorial page

Deckhouse Five
Deckhouse Five
Deckhouse Five
Conflicts in 1967
1967 in Vietnam
Deckhouse Five
United States Marine Corps in the Vietnam War
January 1967 events in Asia
History of Bến Tre Province